Clarence William Delgado (born December 15, 2004), is a Filipino teen actor. He was discovered by Star Circle Quest 2011 where he won as The Male Winner. He had appeared in Goin' Bulilit and Way Back Home.

He transferred to GMA Network in 2021 and is currently an artist of Sparkle. he replaced Baste Granfon who supposed to play the role of Nathan Acosta in First Yaya.

Filmography

Television

Films

References

External links

https://www.gmanetwork.com/sparkle/artists/clarencedelgado

Filipino male child actors
Filipino male film actors
Filipino male television actors
Living people
2004 births
Participants in Philippine reality television series
Star Magic
Star Circle Quest participants
Star Circle Quest winners
ABS-CBN personalities
GMA Network personalities
Male actors from Quezon
Tagalog people
21st-century Filipino male actors